Protea amplexicaulis, the clasping-leaf sugarbush, is a flower-bearing shrub that belongs to the genus Protea. The plant is endemic to South Africa and occurs from Citrusdal to the Kogelberg, as well as in the Langeberg. The shrub remains low and spreads out, becoming 1.3 m in diameter and flowering from June to September.

Fire destroys the plant but the seeds survive. The seeds are stored in a shell and spread by the wind. The plant is unisexual. Pollination takes place by the action of rats and mice. The plant grows sandstone soils at heights of 180 to 1,600 m.

In Afrikaans it is known as ′aardroos-suikerbos′.

Gallery

See also
List of Protea species

References

amplexicaulis
Garden plants of Africa
Endemic flora of South Africa